Harry Carman (January 22, 1884 – December 26, 1964) was an American historian. Having attended Syracuse University followed by studies at Columbia, he became a professor at the latter, and served from 1943 to 1950 he served as its dean. During his tenure as Dean, Carman was a strong supporter of the college within the university, particularly of its Core Curriculum. One of his most notable students was Jacques Barzun. Noted Historian and famous author of Abraham Lincoln, Dr. Reinhard H. Luthin, Fulbright Scholar and Columbia Professor, collaborated with Dean Carman to create "Lincoln and the Patronage".

Harry James Carman was born on a farm in Greenfield, New York on January 22, 1884. He attended a one-room district school through the secondary grades and then took over as teacher for several years. Encouraged by a local school official, he passed the entrance exams for Syracuse University and received his bachelor's degree in 1909. After four years of service as principal of Rhinebeck High School, he returned to Syracuse for his master's degree, and, from 1914 to 1917, taught there as instructor and assistant professor of political science.

Harry Carman's connection with Columbia University began in the fall of 1917, when he arrived on Morningside Heights to undertake his work for the doctorate, and, soon afterwards, his duties as an instructor in history in Columbia College. His Ph.D. came in 1919, followed by promotions through the academic grades to a full professorship in 1931. Eight years later, he was named Moore Collegiate Professor. In March 1933, he was appointed to a seat on the Faculty of Political Science.

Carman's scholarly interests were numerous and varied. Among his publications were Social and Economic History of the United States, 2 volumes (1930–34); Jesse Buel, Agricultural Reformer (1947); Lincoln and the Patronage, with R.H. Luthin (1943); A History of the American People with H.C. Syrett (1960); Guide to the Principal Sources for American Civilization 1800–1900 in the City of New York, 2 volumes with A.W. Thompson (1960); A Short History of New York State with D.M. Ellis, J.A. Frost, and H.C. Syrett (1957) and Preparation for Medical Education in the Liberal Arts College (1953).

Regarding his book Lincoln and the Patronage, New York Times writer Theodore Mack, was quoted as saying "the conclusion of the authors at the end of this enlightening and scholarly work does credit to the time and energy that must have gone into it."

Carman Hall, a Columbia dormitory, is named in his honor.

Literature 
 Carman, Harry (1948). Autobiographical essay in

Authored works 
 Lincoln and the Patronage. Harry Carman and Reinhard H Luthin 1943.

References

External links 
 Profile of Carman at Columbia College
Finding aid to the Harry J. Carman papers at Columbia University. Rare Book & Manuscript Library

1884 births
1964 deaths
Columbia University alumni
Columbia University faculty
Historians from New York (state)
Syracuse University alumni